Huanggang is a city in Hubei, China.

Huanggang may also refer to:
 Huanggang, Shenzhen, an area in Shenzhen, China
 Huanggang, Funan County, a town in Anhui, China
 Huanggang, Raoping County, a town in Raoping County, Chaohou, Guangdong, China